The James River National Wildlife Refuge is a National Wildlife Refuge located along the James River in eastern Prince George County, Virginia. Its management is overseen by the United States Fish and Wildlife Service.

One of four refuges that comprise the Eastern Virginia Rivers National Wildlife Refuge Complex, James River National Wildlife Refuge was founded in 1991 to protect nesting and roosting habitat of the bald eagle from development.   The refuge's  of forest and wetlands are bordered by Powell Creek to the west, and by Flowerdew Hundred Plantation to the east.

The land that is now the refuge was the site of Powellbrooke Plantation, whose owner Captain Nathaniel Powell (one of the original 1607 colonists), his wife, and ten others were killed during the Indian Massacre of 1622, and later Merchant's Hope Plantation during colonial times.

References

External links
James River National Wildlife Refuge

National Wildlife Refuges in Virginia
Protected areas of Prince George County, Virginia
Protected areas established in 1991
1991 establishments in Virginia
Wetlands of Virginia
Landforms of Prince George County, Virginia